Emily Herfoss (née Roper; born 24 July 1994) is an Australian professional racing cyclist, who currently rides for UCI Women's Continental Team .

Personal life
In 2019, she married motorcycle racer and cyclist Troy Herfoss, a two-time Australian Superbike Championship winner and sometime Superbike World Championship competitor.

Major results

2012
 UCI Junior Road World Championships
4th Time trial
9th Road race
2013
 7th Open de Suède Vårgårda
 9th Time trial, Oceania Cycling Championships
2014
 6th Time trial, Oceania Cycling Championships
 6th Road race, Australian National Road Race Championships
2016
 9th Time trial, Australian National Time Trial Championships
2019
 4th Winston-Salem Cycling Classic
 6th Overall Women's Herald Sun Tour
 7th Road race, Australian National Road Race Championships
 8th Cadel Evans Great Ocean Road Race
 9th Overall Women's Tour Down Under
2020
 2nd Race Torquay
 National Road Championships
3rd Time trial
4th Road race

References

External links

1994 births
Living people
Australian female cyclists
Australian sportswomen
20th-century Australian women
21st-century Australian women